Aloka Amarasiri (born 6 May 1989) is a Sri Lankan cricketer. He made his first-class debut for Bloomfield Cricket and Athletic Club in the 2015–16 Premier League Tournament on 26 February 2016.

References

External links
 

1989 births
Living people
Sri Lankan cricketers
Bloomfield Cricket and Athletic Club cricketers
Cricketers from Colombo